Marcia Teresa Videaux Jiménez (born 21 July 1999) is a Cuban artistic gymnast. She is the 2015 Pan American Games champion and the 2018 Pan American Championships silver medalist on the vault. She is the 2018 Central American and Caribbean Games team, all-around, and floor exercise champion and the vault and uneven bars silver medalist. She has won four medals, including two gold, on the FIG World Cup series. She represented Cuba at the 2016 and 2020 Summer Olympics.

Career 
Videaux began gymnastics when she was five years old.

2015 
Videaux made her international debut at the 2015 Anadia World Challenge Cup where she won the gold medal on the vault and the bronze medal on the uneven bars. She then won the gold medal in the vault final at the Pan American Games in Toronto with an average score of 14.737. Additionally, Cuba placed fourth in the team competition, and Videaux placed ninth in the all-around final. At the Osijek World Challenge Cup, she won the silver medal on the floor exercise behind Paula Mejías and also placed fifth on vault and seventh on uneven bars. She then competed at the World Championships in Glasgow and finished fifty-fifth in the all-around during the qualification round.

2016 
Videaux competed at the Olympic Test Event and qualified for the 2016 Olympic Games by finished twenty-sixth in the all-around. She then won the gold medal on the vault at the Anadia World Challenge Cup and also finished eighth on the uneven bars. She represented Cuba at the 2016 Summer Olympics and finished forty-eighth in the all-around during the qualification round with a total score of 52.024.

2017 
Videaux competed at the Central American Sports Festival in Guatemala City and won the silver medal in the all-around behind teammate Yesenia Ferrera and Cuba won the team silver medal by one point behind Mexico. She also won the uneven bars gold medal and the bronze medals on balance beam and floor exercise. Then at the World Championships in Montreal, she only competed on the vault and uneven bars and did not advance into either final.

2018 
At the Central American and Caribbean Games, Videaux won gold medals with the Cuban team and in the individual all-around where she finished 1.700 ahead of silver-medalist Andrea Maldonado. Then in the event finals, she won another gold on the floor exercise and also won silver medals on the vault and the uneven bars. Then at the Pan American Championships, she won the silver medal on vault behind Jade Carey and placed fifth in the all-around, floor exercise, and team competition. She was not sent to the World Championships in Doha due to budget cuts by Cuba's National Sports and Recreation Institute.

2019 
Videaux qualified for the vault final at the Doha World Cup in fifth place, but she withdrew due to a thigh injury. Then at the Pan American Games, she placed sixth with the Cuban team, tenth in the all-around, and seventh in the vault final. She qualified for an individual spot at the 2020 Olympic Games by finishing fifty-third in the all-around at the 2019 World Championships.

2020-21 
Videaux did not compete in 2020 or prior to the postponed 2020 Olympic Games due to the COVID-19 pandemic in Cuba.

Videaux represented Cuba at the 2020 Summer Olympics and decided to only compete on the vault in order to focus on qualifying for the vault final. However, she fell on her second vault during the qualification round and placed sixteenth, missing the event final.

Competitive history

References

External links
 
 

1999 births
Living people
Cuban female artistic gymnasts
Gymnasts at the 2015 Pan American Games
Gymnasts at the 2019 Pan American Games
Pan American Games gold medalists for Cuba
Gymnasts at the 2016 Summer Olympics
Olympic gymnasts of Cuba
Pan American Games medalists in gymnastics
Central American and Caribbean Games gold medalists for Cuba
Central American and Caribbean Games silver medalists for Cuba
Competitors at the 2018 Central American and Caribbean Games
Central American and Caribbean Games medalists in gymnastics
Medalists at the 2015 Pan American Games
Gymnasts at the 2020 Summer Olympics
People from Manzanillo, Cuba
21st-century Cuban women